Georgi Krasovski (born 20 December 1979 in Poti, Georgian SSR) is a retired Georgian/Polish professional football player who played as a defender.

Career statistics

References

External links
 Profile at Armenian football federation

1979 births
Living people
People from Poti
Footballers from Georgia (country)
Expatriate footballers from Georgia (country)
SC Tavriya Simferopol players
FC Ararat Yerevan players
Mes Sarcheshme players
Ulisses FC players
Expatriate footballers in Azerbaijan
Expatriate footballers in Ukraine
Expatriate footballers in Uzbekistan
Expatriate footballers in Armenia
Expatriate footballers in Iran
Expatriate sportspeople from Georgia (country) in Azerbaijan
Armenian Premier League players
Gabala FC players
Association football defenders